The nuclear football (also known as the atomic football, the president's emergency satchel, the Presidential Emergency Satchel, the button, the black box, or just the football) is a briefcase, the contents of which are to be used by the president of the United States to authorize a nuclear attack while away from fixed command centers, such as the White House Situation Room or the Presidential Emergency Operations Center. It functions as a mobile hub in the strategic defense system of the United States. It is held by an aide-de-camp.

Contents 
In his 1980 book Breaking Cover, Bill Gulley, former director of the White House Military Office, wrote:

According to a 2005 Washington Post article, the president is always accompanied by a military aide carrying the nuclear football with launch codes for nuclear weapons. A separate 2005 article described the football as a metal Zero Halliburton briefcase. A small antenna protrudes from the bag near the handle, suggesting that it also contains communications equipment of some kind.

Operation 

If the US president (who is the commander-in-chief of the armed forces) decides to order the use of nuclear weapons, the briefcase would be opened. A command signal, or "watch" alert, would then be issued to the Joint Chiefs of Staff. The president would then review the attack options with the secretary of defense and the Chairman of the Joint Chiefs of Staff and decide on a plan, which could range from the launch of a single cruise missile to that of multiple ICBMs. These are among the preset war plans developed under OPLAN 8010 (formerly the Single Integrated Operational Plan). Then, using Milstar, the aide, a military officer, would contact the National Military Command Center and NORAD to determine the scope of the pre-emptive nuclear strike and prepare a second strike, following which Milstar/Advanced Extremely High Frequency or Boeing E-4Bs and TACAMOs would transmit the currently valid nuclear launch code to all operational nuclear delivery systems. A two-person verification procedure would precede the entering of the codes into a Permissive Action Link.

Before the order can be processed by the military, the president must be positively identified using a special code issued on a plastic card, nicknamed the "biscuit". The United States has a two-man rule in place at nuclear launch facilities, and while only the president can order the release of nuclear weapons, the order must be verified by the secretary of defense to be an authentic order given by the president (there is a hierarchy of succession in the event the president is killed in an attack). This verification process ensures the order came from the actual president; the secretary of defense has no veto power and must comply with the president's order. Once all the codes have been verified, the president "may direct the use of nuclear weapons through an executive order via the Chairman of the Joint Chiefs of Staff to the combatant commanders, and, ultimately, to the forces in the field exercising direct control of the weapons." These orders are given and then re-verified for authenticity. 

It has been argued that the president has almost sole authority to initiate a nuclear attack because the Secretary of Defense is required to verify the order but cannot veto it. However, the president's authority as Commander-in-Chief is not unlimited; US law dictates that the attack must be lawful and that military officers are required to refuse to execute unlawful orders, such as those that violate the Laws of Armed Conflict. Therefore, the Chairman of the Joint Chiefs of Staff and other servicemembers in the chain of command must refuse to issue the execute order if such an order is unlawful. Several military officials, including General John Hyten, have testified to the US Congress that they would refuse to carry out an unlawful order for a nuclear strike. Yet if the Chairman of the Joint Chiefs of Staff were to refuse to issue the execute order as directed by the president, the president could reassign or fire the Chairman and appoint a replacement, including waiving the required credentials if all other qualified officers refused the appointment or if the president determined that it was in the national interest. In addition, off-the-shelf strike packages are pre-vetted by lawyers to confirm that they are legal and, thus, such a strike would be presumed to be a lawful order. Furthermore, military servicemembers have been reprimanded in the past for questioning US protocols for nuclear strike authority, notably Major Harold Hering, who was discharged from the Air Force in late 1975 for asking the question "How can I know that an order I receive to launch my missiles came from a sane president?"

The football is carried by one of the rotating presidential military aides (one from each of the six armed forces service branches), whose work schedule is described by a top-secret rota. This person is a commissioned officer in the U.S. military, pay-grade O-4 or above, who has undergone the nation's most rigorous background check (Yankee White). These officers are required to keep the football readily accessible to the president at all times. Consequently, the aide, football in hand, is always either standing or walking near the president, including riding on Air Force One, on Marine One, or in the presidential motorcade with the president.

There are three nuclear footballs in all; two are allocated to the president and vice president, with the last being stored in the White House. The practice of also providing an aide with a football to the vice president, to whom command authority would devolve if the president is disabled, began during the Carter administration. In presidential transitions, the president-elect does not receive the actual nuclear code card until after the nuclear briefing, which usually occurs when "he meets with the outgoing president at the White House just before the actual inauguration ceremony. The code card is activated electronically right after the president-elect takes the oath at noon".

In the event the outgoing president is not present at the inauguration – as happened in 2021 when Donald Trump did not attend the inauguration of Joe Biden but stayed in Florida – one football is kept with him and remains active until 11:59:59 AM on inauguration day. After that point, the now-former president is denied access to the football, its codes are automatically deactivated, and the aide carrying the football returns to Washington, DC. In the meantime, the incoming president receives one of the spare footballs at the pre-inauguration nuclear briefing, as well as a "biscuit" with codes that become active at 12:00:00 PM.

History 
The nuclear football dates back to the presidency of Dwight D. Eisenhower, but its current usage came about in the aftermath of the Cuban Missile Crisis, when President John F. Kennedy became concerned that a Soviet commander stationed in Cuba might launch missiles without authorization from Moscow. Kennedy asked several questions related to the release of US nuclear weapons. These were:
 "Assuming that information from a closely guarded source causes me to conclude that the U.S. should launch an immediate nuclear strike against the Communist Bloc, does the JCS Emergency Actions File permit me to initiate such an attack without first consulting with the Secretary of Defense and/or the Joint Chiefs of Staff?"
 "I know that the red button on my desk phone will connect me with the White House Army Signal Agency (WHASA) switchboard and that the WHASA switchboard can connect me immediately to the Joint War Room. If I called the Joint War Room without giving them advance notice, to whom would I be speaking?"
 "What would I say to the Joint War Room to launch an immediate nuclear strike?"
 "How would the person who received my instructions verify them?"

An Associated Press article stated that the nickname "football" was derived from a nuclear attack plan codenamed "Dropkick". The nickname has led to some confusion as to the nature—and even the shape—of the device, as the leather bag or "jacket" in which it is carried appears large enough to contain an actual American football.

During their presidencies, both Jimmy Carter and Ronald Reagan preferred to keep the launch codes in their jacket pockets. Among those who carried the football for Carter and Reagan was a future U.S. congressman, John Kline, who served as a colonel in the United States Marine Corps before representing Minnesota in the United States House of Representatives from 2003 to 2017.

The coded card, or "biscuit", was separated from a severely wounded Ronald Reagan immediately after the 1981 assassination attempt against him when his clothing was cut off by the emergency department trauma team. It was later discovered lying unsecured in one of his shoes on the emergency department floor. This led to an urban legend that Reagan carried the code in his sock. During the incident, Reagan was separated from the rest of the football as well, because the officer who carried it was left behind as the motorcade sped away with the wounded president.

On occasion, the president has left his aide carrying the football behind. This happened to President Richard Nixon in 1973; after Nixon presented Soviet leader Leonid Brezhnev with a Lincoln Continental at Camp David, Maryland, Brezhnev unexpectedly drove with Nixon off the retreat onto a highway, leaving Nixon's Secret Service personnel behind and separating Nixon from the football (and his security detail) for nearly 30 minutes. Presidents Gerald Ford, Jimmy Carter, George H. W. Bush, and Bill Clinton have also been separated from the football.

Recent times

As the nuclear football is required to be near the president at all times, the aides carrying it frequently appear in press photographs. In February 2017, a guest at President Trump's Mar-a-Lago resort posed for a photo with the military aide carrying the football, posting the image to Facebook and identifying the aide by his first name. The photo was posted while Trump was hosting Japanese Prime Minister Shinzo Abe, around the same time as news broke that North Korea had fired a nuclear-capable Pukkuksong-2 ballistic missile over the Sea of Japan. U.S. military officials clarified that it was neither illegal nor against proper procedure for the officer to appear in such a photo, although they conceded that the situation was strange.

On November 8, 2017, when President Trump made a state visit to China, U.S. military aides carrying the football were reportedly involved in a "short scuffle" with Chinese security officials, after the latter tried to bar the former access to the Great Hall of the People auditorium. Political correspondent Jonathan Swan, who reported the incident, wrote "I’m told that at no point did the Chinese have the nuclear football in their possession or even touch the briefcase. I’m also told the head of the Chinese security detail apologised to the Americans afterwards for the misunderstanding."

On January 6, 2021, during the storming of the United States Capitol by rioters, security footage, displayed during the subsequent Trump impeachment trial, showed Vice President Mike Pence along with the aide carrying the backup football being hastily evacuated from the Senate chamber. While the vice president was sheltering with his team and family, the football came within  of the approaching rioters. Its capture during the event could have resulted in the loss of sensitive intelligence surrounding pre-planned nuclear strike options. It was later reported that military officials were unaware of the danger to the football during the riot.

Following President Trump's failure to secure a second term, he did not attend President Biden's inauguration, when the football is normally handed over. Instead, Trump's football remained with him while a second one accompanied Biden. At the exact 12:00 PM EST transition time, the codes in Trump's and Pence's (who did attend the inauguration) footballs were deactivated, and those in Biden's and incoming Vice President Kamala Harris's were activated.

In February 2021, a group of 31 Congress members signed a letter requesting that President Biden give up sole authority to use the nuclear launch codes. The letter asked Biden "to install checks [and] balances in our nuclear command-and-control structure" and proposed alternatives to the existing structure.

The 1986 Goldwater–Nichols Act streamlined the military chain of command, which now runs from the president through the secretary of defense directly to combatant commanders (CCDRs, all four-star generals or admirals), bypassing the service chiefs. The service chiefs were assigned to an advisory role to the president and the secretary of defense and given the responsibility for training and equipping personnel in the unified combatant commands.

See also 

 Cheget, the Russian counterpart
 Continuity of government
 Emergency Action Message
 Gold Codes
 Letters of last resort, the British counterpart
 Nuclear briefcase
 Permissive Action Link
 Roger Fisher, the academic who proposed putting the nuclear codes inside a person so that the US president has to take a life to activate the country's nuclear weapons
 Two-man rule

Notes

Further reading 
 Ford, Daniel F. (1985). The Button: The Pentagon's Strategic Command and Control System. New York: Simon and Schuster. . .
 Gulley, Bill, and Mary Ellen Reese. (1980). Breaking Cover. New York: Simon and Schuster. . .

External links
 

Executive Office of the President of the United States
American inventions
United States nuclear command and control